José Augusto Loureiro Júnior (born 30 September 1969) is a Brazilian rower. He competed in the men's coxed four event at the 1992 Summer Olympics.

References

1969 births
Living people
Brazilian male rowers
Olympic rowers of Brazil
Rowers at the 1992 Summer Olympics
Place of birth missing (living people)